Yeongjong-Yongyu(영종용유, 永宗龍游) is a region in Jung District, Incheon. It encompass Yeongjongdo and adjacent islands such as Muuido except Bukdo-myeon, Ongjin County, Incheon. The island is an exclave of Incheon Metropolitan City's Jung-gu district, It is accessed via two bridges, Yeongjong Bridge connecting to Seo-gu and Incheon Bridge connecting to Songdo. Many residents Yeongjong-Yongyu demanded that Yeongjong-Yongyu should be a district of Incheon and old downtown area of Jung District, Incheon should be merged with Dong District, Incheon. In 2022, Yeongjong-Yongyu's Korean national population exceeded 100 thousands and  old downtown area of Jung and Dong Districts.

On August 31, 2022. Yoo Jeong-bok who is a Mayor of Incheon officialized this proposal to a city policy. Old downtown area of Jung District and Dong District will be merged into Jemulpo District and Yeongjong-Yongyu will be an independent Yeongjong District. Two mayors of effected districts agreed this proposal.

References

Regions of Korea
Jung District, Incheon
Proposed political divisions